Sniper's Ridge is a 1961 Korean War drama film directed by John A. Bushelman and starring Jack Ging and Stanley Clements.

Plot
In the days before the cease-fire, a hard-luck platoon run by Lt. Peer and the cowardly Sgt. Sweatish is under continual attack and suffers heavy casualties. The only good soldier in the platoon is Cpl. Sharack, who should have been rotated off the line long ago but was kept on the front by Capt. Tombolo. The return of Cpl. Pumphrey reveals a deeper motive for the Captain's behavior – Tombolo did not try to rescue his children from a burning house and now tries to re-earn his self-respect with the lives of his men, especially Sharack whose heroism he is jealous of.

When no one in the platoon wants to mark the location of an unexploded shell, Capt. Tombolo decides to do it himself. He steps on a mine, which will explode when he steps off. Only Sharack and Sweatish can rescue him.

Cast
 Jack Ging as Cpl. Sharack
 Stanley Clements as Cpl. Pumphrey
 John Goddard as Capt. Tombolo
 Douglas Henderson as Sgt. Sweatish
 Gabe Castle as Lt. Peer
 Allan Marvin as Pvt. Ward
 Anton von Stralen as Bear
 Al Freeman Jr. as Medic Gwathney
 Mason Curry as David
 Henry Darrow as Pvt. Tonto
 Mark Douglas as Bo-Bo
 Thomas A. Sweet as Soldier
 Scott Randall as Soldier
 Joe Cawthon as Pvt. Owens
 George Yoshinaga as Mongolian

Production
Star Jack Ging had just appeared in Tess for producer Robert L. Lippert. Filming started 14 November 1960.

See also
 List of American films of 1961

References

External links
 
 
 

1961 films
1961 drama films
1960s English-language films
1960s war drama films
20th Century Fox films
CinemaScope films
American war drama films
Films directed by John A. Bushelman
Films scored by Richard LaSalle
Korean War films
1960s American films